Jajce I Hydroelectric Power Station is a diversion type of hydroelectric power plant, taking its waters from Great Pliva Lake, whose powerhouse (generation hall, generating station or generating plant) is situated underground near Podmilačje, in Bosnia and Herzegovina. It use two 30 MW generators, total installed capacity of 60 MW.

Also see
Pliva
 Jajce-2 Hydroelectric Power Station

References

Hydroelectric power stations in Bosnia and Herzegovina
Underground hydroelectric power stations in Bosnia and Herzegovina

Jajce